Burra Creek is a stream in South Australia rising in the northern Mount Lofty Ranges, flowing generally southwards and eastwards to join the River Murray at Morgan.

Course and features
The stream rises near Hallett in the northern Mount Lofty Ranges and flows generally southwards through the township of Burra to the Burra Gorge near Worlds End at which point the course changes to flow generally eastwards.

See also

 
 Hundred of Kooringa

References

Rivers of South Australia